Quick Look is a quick preview feature developed by Apple Inc. which was introduced in its operating system Mac OS X 10.5 Leopard. The feature was announced at the Worldwide Developers Conference on Jun. 11, 2007.

While macOS's Finder has always had smaller previews in Get Info windows or column view, Quick Look allows users to look at the contents of a file at full or near-full size in the Finder, depending on the size of the document relative to the screen resolution.  It can preview files such as  PDFs, HTML, QuickTime readable media, plain text and RTF text documents, iWork (Keynote, Pages, and Numbers) documents, ODF documents, Microsoft Office (Word, Excel, and PowerPoint) files (including OOXML), and RAW camera images.

Quick Look can also be opened in full screen and launched from the command line. Additionally, multi-page documents like PowerPoint slide shows can be navigated using the slide previews at the side of the preview window.

Quick Look technology is implemented throughout the Apple suite of software starting with Mac OS X 10.5, including iChat Theater, Time Machine, and Finder's Cover Flow.

Quick Look APIs are available to developers via the Quick Look framework on iOS and as part of the Quartz framework on the Mac.

Supported file types by default
Since its debut, Quick Look has included a number of generators for common file types.

Plug-ins
Plug-ins can be added to Quick Look to allow previewing the content of other file formats. Plug-ins can also be used to add additional functionality to Quick Look such as syntax highlighting for source code files.

To add a plug-in to Quick Look it needs to be placed in the folder /Library/QuickLook/. To activate that plug-in, either the computer needs to be restarted or Quick Look needs to be reset with the command qlmanage -r

Usage
There are multiple ways to invoke Quick Look.

Keyboard shortcuts:
 -
 
 - (open in full screen)
  hold to zoom an image to actual size (Quick Look must already be open)

Command line:
qlmanage -p file
Menu:
 File — Quick Look file name;
 Context menu (right-click or -mouse click), then Quick Look file name.

Caching and Forensics
Quick Look can be exploited when conducting a forensic examination of a computer's contents. A thumbnail cache is created for each user in a random subfolder of /var/folders called com.apple.QuickLook.thumbnailcache. The cache contains two files; 
 index.sqlite which is a SQLite database containing two tables - files and thumbnails.
files contains the name, path, file-identifier, and volume-identifier of each file in the database.

thumbnails contains metadata about each thumbnail, including the file linked-to in the files table and the offset of its data contained in thumbnails.data.
  thumbnails.data contains the raw bitmaps of the cached thumbnails. 
Quick Look thumbnails are stored for documents on internal disks and also for documents located on removable disks, including those that have been encrypted and can pose a significant security hole. A document may well have a number of thumbnails, each having different dimensions that can range from very large to very small.

The cache can be reset by invoking the qlmanage -r cache command via a Terminal window.

See also
 GNOME sushi
 Office Open XML software
 OpenDocument software
 Windows thumbnail cache

References

External links
 A Quick Look Plugins list for Mac OS X
 Gloobus, a Linux application based on Quick Look

MacOS